Joshua High School is a public high school located in the city of Joshua, Texas. The school is in the Joshua Independent School District.

History 
The school was opened in 1907. The centenary was celebrated in 2007.

Sports 
The Joshua Fighting Owls play their home games at Owl Stadium located behind the high school.

References 

Public high schools in Texas
Schools in Johnson County, Texas
1907 establishments in Texas